Frederick Watson Williams (29 January 1900 – 7 March 1975) was an Australian rules footballer who played with Fitzroy and Carlton in the Victorian Football League (VFL).

Football

Williams played his early football with Bacchus Marsh club Melton. A wingman, he spent most of the 1920s at Fitzroy and was a regular member of the team. He played in their 1922 premiership side and kicked his only goal of the year in the Grand Final. The following season he represented the VFL in an interstate match against South Australia. An injury cost him a place in the 1923 Grand Final and he finished his career at Carlton, where he appeared in two Preliminary Final losses, to bring his finals tally to 10.

References
 Holmesby, Russell and Main, Jim (2007). The Encyclopedia of AFL Footballers. 7th ed. Melbourne: Bas Publishing.

External links

Blueseum profile

1900 births
1975 deaths
Australian rules footballers from Melbourne
Australian Rules footballers: place kick exponents
Fitzroy Football Club players
Fitzroy Football Club Premiership players
Carlton Football Club players
Melton Football Club players
One-time VFL/AFL Premiership players